TKK Fried Chicken is a Taiwanese chain of fried chicken restaurants. Outside its Taiwan locations, TKK also has branches in China and the United States. TKK opened its first restaurant on 20 July 1974, in Ximending located in Taipei City. On 2 November 2013, TKK opened its first gastropub, TKK the BAR, in the Eastern District of Taipei to serve items from the original menu as well as other products exclusive to the bar, thereby becoming one of the only few fried chicken restaurants in the world to also operate a gastropub.

Locations 
Taiwan - 67
China - 6
United States - 10
Malaysia
BooVille

See also 
 J&G Fried Chicken

References

External links 
  

Taiwanese brands
Restaurant chains in Taiwan
Restaurants in China
Chinese restaurants
Restaurants established in 1974
Gastropubs
1974 establishments in Taiwan
Fast-food poultry restaurants